DAMAC Tower Nine Elms is a 50-storey, 170-metre high skyscraper located at 69-71 Bondway, Vauxhall, London. Originally scheduled to be completed by 2020, the tower's opening was ultimately delayed to June 2022.

The tower consists of 360 apartments, with interiors are designed by Donatella Versace. The apartments went on sale on 21 July 2015, with all the Thames-side apartments having been "pre-sold". Prices start at £711,000 for a studio.

Planning history
In November 2013, KPF announced a proposal for new building to be called "New Bondway", featuring two connected towers of 50 stories and 23 stories featuring 450 flats, 3,700m2 of office space and 1,000m2 of shops.
The planning application to the London Borough of Lambeth is 14/00601/FUL.

Ownership
The original joint developers, Citygrove Securities and McLaren Property, sold the project to DAMAC Properties in June 2015.

Construction
In August 2016, it was announced that DAMAC had awarded the £200 million building contract to Lendlease.

Gallery

References

Skyscrapers in the London Borough of Wandsworth
Proposed skyscrapers in London
Buildings and structures under construction in the United Kingdom
Versace
Residential skyscrapers in London
Kohn Pedersen Fox buildings
Nine Elms